Goviller is a commune in the Meurthe-et-Moselle department in north-eastern France. The village sits at the foot of the iconic Bois d'Anon, the round-shaped woods atop a prominent hill which can be seen from kilometres away, and is surrounded mainly by agricultural lands.

See also 
 Communes of the Meurthe-et-Moselle department

References

Communes of Meurthe-et-Moselle